Skripka or Skrypka is a surname, meaning "violin" in Russian and Ukrainian. Notable people with this surname include:
Anna Skripka, Ukrainian-American mathematician
Oleh Skrypka (born 1964), Ukrainian musician
Sergei Skripka, Soviet and Russian music conductor
Sergey Skripka (born 1950), Soviet middle-distance runner

See also
 

Russian-language surnames
Ukrainian-language surnames